These are the official results of the Men's Javelin Throw event at the 2003 World Championships in Paris, France. There were a total number of 21 participating athletes, with the final held on Sunday 31 August 2003.

Medalists

Schedule
All times are Central European Time (UTC+1)

Abbreviations
All results shown are in metres

Records

Qualification

Group A

Group B

Final

See also
 1998 Men's European Championships Javelin Throw (Budapest)
 2000 Men's Olympic Javelin Throw (Sydney)
 2002 Men's European Championships Javelin Throw (Munich)
 2004 Men's Olympic Javelin Throw (Athens)

References
 Results
 koti.welho

J
Javelin throw at the World Athletics Championships